Christmas in Harmony is the fourth studio album by American pop group Wilson Phillips. A Christmas album, it is their first in six years, after their 2004 covers album California. The album sees them reunite with Glen Ballard, who also produced their first two albums.

It is the first Christmas album of the group, although the Wilson sisters released a Christmas album in 1993, titled Hey Santa!, and Carnie Wilson released a solo Christmas album titled Christmas with Carnie in 2007. It includes a mixture of traditional Christmas carols, covers of Christmas themed songs and new compositions. The song "Warm Lovin' Christmastime" was written by Carnie's husband, Rob Bonfiglio, and was originally included on Carnie's solo Christmas album.

The first single released was "I Wish It Could Be Christmas Every Day", and the group filmed a video for it.

Track listing

Personnel 

Wilson Phillips
 Chynna Phillips – vocals 
 Carnie Wilson – vocals 
 Wendy Wilson – vocals

Musicians
 Zac Rae – keyboards, rhythm arrangements (1-12)
 Glen Ballard – synthesizers, rhythm arrangements (1-12)
 Rob Bonfiglio – programming, scat
 Scott Campbell – programming
 David Levita – guitars
 Simon Smith – bass
 Blair Sinta – drums
 Kim Hutchcroft – saxophones 
 Brian Wilson – arrangements (13)

Production 
 Producer – Glen Ballard
 Executive Producers – Rick Blaskey, David Simone and Winston Simone.
 Vocal Production – Rob Bonfiglio and Carnie Wilson
 Vocal Arrangements – Glen Ballard and Wilson Phillips 
 Engineers – Rob Bonfiglio, Scott Campbell and Bill Malina.
 Assistant Engineer – Brian Warwick 
 Mixing – Scott Campbell and Bill Malina
 Editing – Scott Campbell and Brian Warwick
 Mastered by Stephen Marcussen at Marcussen Mastering (Hollywood, California).
 A&R – Gregory Davidson and Cathleen Murphy 
 Production Coordinator – Jolie Levine 
 Project Coordinator – Angela Vicari
 Project Development – Laura Kazan and Jennifer Liebeskind
 Art Direction – Roxanne Silmak
 Package Design – Jeff Schultz 
 Photography – Randee St. Nicholas 
 Manager – Alex Miller

Charts

References

Albums produced by Glen Ballard
Wilson Phillips albums
2010 Christmas albums
Christmas albums by American artists
Pop Christmas albums